Feng Jialiang (Chinese: 封加梁; b. 1966) is a painter from Wuxi, Jiangsu province, China, specializing in oil painting.

He studied oil painting in the School of Fine Arts in Nanjing University of the Arts and was awarded a bachelor's degree in 1991. He was awarded a master's degree in oil painting by Nanjing Normal University and began his teaching career there in 1997. He further studied techniques and materials in École nationale supérieure des Beaux-Arts de Paris in 1998, and went on a study tour in the US from 1999–2002 and an academic exchange to Russia in 2002. He was awarded a doctor of arts in 2009.

Currently residing in Nanjing, Feng is a professor and graduate supervisor in the School of Fine Arts in Nanjing Normal University and Deputy Secretary General of Jiangsu Oil Painting Association.

Exhibitions 
 1989, The Girl, Seventh National Art Exhibition
 1990, Still Life, Exhibition of Oil Painting, Nanjing
 1991, Portrait of A Female College Student, Second prize of Jiangsu Oil Painting Exhibition, collected by Wuxi Gallery
 1992, The Girl, 1992 China Exhibition of Oil Paintings
 1996, The Green Background, Jiangsu Exhibition of Oil Painted Portraits 
 1998, The Wall of Mountains, First Jiangsu Art Festival
 1999, The Stone Tablet, Jiangsu Exhibition of Oil Paintings
 1999, Self-Portrait, One Hundred Years, One Hundred People, One Hundred Family Names
 1999, The Series of Buddha, Personal Exhibition in the US 
 2000, The Series of Portraits, Personal Exhibition in the US
 2003, The Series of Buddha, Personal Exhibition in Nanjing Gallery
 2011, Dusk and Night, The Overlapping World – Exhibition of Contemporary Art in Nanjing Gu’an Art Center
 2011, The Series of Human Bodies, Asking the Way – Exhibition of Contemporary Art, Xijinhui Gallery of Contemporary Art, Jiangsu
 2011, The Portrait, Discovering the Noumenon – Exhibition of Jiangsu Young and Middle-aged Oil Painters, Guangdong Lingnan Gallery 
 2011, Dusk, National Exhibition of Art Teachers, Guangdong Gallery
 2011, Night and Restraint, Wuxi Centenary Exhibition of Oil Paintings, Wuxi Sujia Gallery
 2012, Descent, awarded work of excellence in the Eighth Jiangsu Oil Painting Exhibition, Jiangsu Gallery
 2012, Personal Exhibition of Feng Jialiang, Beijing 798 Art Zone
 2012, Inside and Outside the Frame – Width 5, Exhibition of Contemporary Arts
 2012, Depiction of Jiangsu - Exhibition of One Hundred Painters, Nanjing University of the Arts
 2012, Broad, Concise, Profound, Aesthetic – Exhibition of 100th Anniversary of NUA
 2012, Traitor to Art, Nanjing Shangdong Contemporary Gallery
 2012, Fatigue and Extension – Departure from Nanjing, Nanjing Sanchuan Contemporary Gallery
 2013, Exhibition of Contemporary Asian Arts, Hong Kong
 2013, Grace of the Age – Art Exhibition of Jiangsu Universities, Gallery of NUA
 2013, Detached from Material Life – Exhibition of Jiangsu Contemporary Arts, Zhejiang Gallery
 2013, Exhibition in Fangshan Art Camp, Nanjing
 2014, Nanjing International Art Exhibition, Nanjing International Expo Center

Publications 
 1996, Romance of Rivers and Lakes: Fachang’s Paintings, Chinese Painters
 2004, Reconstruction of Art Education System, Art and Design
 2005, Unfulfilled Dreams of Space: Modigliani and His Caryatids, Exploration of Art
 2005, The Creation and Evolution of Giorgione’s Sleeping Females, Artists
 2006, Oil Painting – Textbook for University Art Students
 2010, The Cause to Xu Beihong’s Realism, New Art
 2011, The New Order of Chinese Painting and Calligraphy in Home Decoration, Chinese Decoration
 2011, The Visual Order of National Fancy: Analysis of the Visual Logic of Spanish Superealistic Oil Paintings in 20th Century, Art and Design
 2011, Study on Xu Beihong’s Theory of Art Education

Collections 
Feng’s works are mostly collected by collectors from the US, Germany, South Korea, Hong Kong and Mainland China.

Notes

External links
 Faculty page at Nanjing Normal University

Living people
Painters from Wuxi
1966 births
Writers from Wuxi
Educators from Wuxi
Academic staff of Nanjing Normal University